Lake Annette is a lake in Alberta, Canada.

Lake Annette was named after Annette Astley, the wife of a local entrepreneur.

See also
List of lakes of Alberta

References

Lakes of Alberta